The Unter Gabelhorn is a mountain of the Swiss Pennine Alps, located west of Zermatt in the canton of Valais. It lies east of the Ober Gabelhorn, on the chain separating the valley of Trift (north) from the valley of Zmutt (south).

On its northern side, the mountain overlooks the Gabelhorn Glacier.

References

External links
 Unter Gabelhorn on Hikr

Mountains of the Alps
Alpine three-thousanders
Mountains of Valais
Mountains of Switzerland